Jürgen Hartmann (born 20 July 1953) is a German sports shooter. He competed in the men's 50 metre free pistol event at the 1984 Summer Olympics.

References

External links
 

1953 births
Living people
German male sport shooters
Olympic shooters of West Germany
Shooters at the 1984 Summer Olympics
People from Werra-Meißner-Kreis
Sportspeople from Kassel (region)